Immortal Kombat may refer to:

 "Immortal Kombat" (Mortal Kombat: Conquest)
 "Immortal Kombat" (Supergirl)

See also

 
 Immortal Combat (disambiguation)
 Mortal Kombat (disambiguation)